Ab Pakhsh District is in Dashtestan County, Bushehr province, Iran. At the 2006 census, the district's constituent villages were a part of Shabankareh District and had a population of 19,848 in 4,153 households. The following census in 2011 counted 21,352 people in 5,377 households, by which time Ab Pakhsh District had been established. At the latest census in 2016, the district had 23,132 inhabitants living in 6,478 households.

References 

Districts of Bushehr Province
Populated places in Dashtestan County